The Young Star Search is a kids' talent radio competition based in Northern Ireland and is the current holder of the New York Festival Gold Award for best global radio station promotion. It was also nominated two years running at the UK Arqiva Radio Awards.  Most recently the competition aired on Belfast CityBeat from 2007 -2010 and invited applications from kids aged 8–16 from across Ireland and in 2010 'Young Adults' aged 17–25.

Young Star Search was developed by Northern Ireland radio presenter Stuart Robinson for Castle FM in 2002 based in Carrickfergus, the competition also ran on Bangor FM from 2004, before completely moving to Belfast CityBeat in 2007. Stuart Robinson hosted the show while judges included record producer Micky Modelle.

Due to Robinson's sudden defection in late 2010 from Belfast Citybeat to rivals Cool FM / Downtown Radio the contest was cancelled in 2011. It was unclear if, or when, the contest would return and on what station it would be broadcast. The show returned in 2014 and was broadcast on Downtown Radio and presented by Paul Orr who, like Robinson, used to be a presenter on Belfast Citybeat.  

The competition held auditions in April of each year, preceded by weekly heats in different areas of Northern Ireland between May and July. The semi-final and final, featuring regional winners was staged in Belfast's main shopping centre, Castle Court in August.

Young Star Search, is the biggest talent search for young people in Northern Ireland and boosted over 1,000 entries.

Young Star Christmas Tour 

The Young Star Christmas Tour was a spinoff from Young Star Search which run in 2007 and 2008 on Belfast CityBeat, the tour seen the Young Star (junior) winner from that year headline a group of young singers to perform at Christmas events around Northern Ireland, including the Belfast City Council Christmas Light Switch On. (senior winner performs solo on tour)

In 2007, Rachael Stewart was joined by five other finalists, however in 2008, separate auditions were staged to find fellow band members form Rachel Pearson. 

2007 Group members:
Rachael Stewart
Jordan Richmond
John Gillen
Deborah Morrison
Zoe Skillen
Rhian Gourley
(Song Performed - Happy Xmas War Is Over)

2008 Group members:
Rachel Pearson
Rhian Gourley
Fay Cairnduff
(Song Performed - Rockin' Around The Christmas Tree)

Host 

Stuart Robinson has been the host of Young Star Search since 2002.

Notable judges

Past winners

Other alumni 
Other judges
Andy Pugh 2002-2008
Maurice Taggart 2002-2004
Fat Tam 2004-2005
Justin Macartney 2002-2003
Mark White 2006
Minty 2007
Justin McGurk 2007
Keri Moore 2007
Seaneen Kane 2007
Garrett O'Hare 2008
Natalie Miller 2008

Runners-up
2002 Joanne Corrigan
2002 Shauna Walker
2002 Angela Kennedy
2003 Nicole Sloan
2003 Laura Gilbert
2003 Lauren Dunahoe
2003 Sam White
2004 Stacey McCalister
2004 Seaneen Kane
2005 Sarah Hutcheson
2005 Becky Steed
2005 & 2006 Julianna Edlin
2006 Hannah Rose Henning
2007 Deborah Morrison
2007 Eiblin Stewart
2008 Brooklyn Dunseith
2008 John Gillen
2009 Aoife Kane
2009 Leona Hughes
2010 Shauna Lillywhite
2010 Zoe Skillen
2010 Kerry Wilson

Trivia 

 Darcy McLean is the only person to have won Young Star twice.
 Julianna Edlin from Carrickfergus has come closest to winning most often without actually winning, finishing 3rd in 2004 and 2nd in both 2005 and 2006.
 Jon Gillen has also finished 4th in 2005, 3rd in 2007 and 2nd in 2008. Zoe Skillen has finished 5th in both 2007 & 2008 and runner-up in 2010
 Casey Wallace, Donald Montgomery, Julie Gower, Megan McConnell and Nicole McGoogin had all previously entered Young Star before winning.
 Rachael Stewart is the most successful Young Star winner in terms of votes, followed by Caitline McClurg and Sophie Hollran.
 Seaneen Kane was previously runner-up of Young Star in 2004 (Bangor) before becoming a judge in 2007.
 In 2008, the senior section had the closest final ever with John Gillen losing by only 30 votes.
 Rhian Gourley featured in the 2007 and 2008 Young Star Christmas Group.
 In 2009 Rachael Stewart (2007 winner) competed again, this time finishing fourth.
 In 2009 Rachel Pearson (2008 winner) competed again, this time finishing fourth.
 Chantelle Macateer from Dromore has now finished 8th in 2008 and 2009.

External links 
 http://www.citybeat.co.uk/goto.php?id=854&pg=YoungStar&sess=+A595742535D54+F1D42131744505D1D1D59435A50+9+6581D1F5E425954465014+64B14165F
 http://archives.tcm.ie/downdemocrat/2007/06/19/story3322.asp

British radio programmes